The 1996 College Football All-America Team is composed of the following All-American Teams: Associated Press, Football Writers Association of America, American Football Coaches Association, Walter Camp Foundation, The Sporting News and Football News.

The College Football All-America Team is an honor given annually to the best American college football players at their respective positions. The original usage of the term All-America seems to have been to such a list selected by football pioneer Walter Camp in the 1890s. The NCAA officially recognizes All-Americans selected by the AP, AFCA, FWAA, WCFF, TSN, and FN to determine Consensus All-Americans.

Offense

Quarterback
Danny Wuerffel, Florida (College Football Hall of Fame) (AP-1, AFCA-Coaches, Walter Camp, TSN, FN)
Jake Plummer, Arizona St. (AP-2, FWAA-Writers)
Peyton Manning, Tennessee (AP-3)

Running backs
Byron Hanspard, Texas Tech  (AP-1, AFCA-Coaches, FWAA-Writers, Walter Camp, TSN, FN)
Troy Davis, Iowa State (College Football Hall of Fame) (AP-1, FWAA-Writers, Walter Camp, TSN, FN)
Warrick Dunn, Florida St. (AP-2, FWAA-Writers)
Darnell Autry, Northwestern  (AP-2, AFCA-Coaches)
Ron Dayne, Wisconsin (College Football Hall of Fame) (AP-3)
Corey Dillon, Washington (AP-3)

Wide receivers
Marcus Harris, Wyoming (AP-1, AFCA-Coaches, FWAA-Writers, Walter Camp, FN)
Ike Hilliard, Florida (AP-3, AFCA-Coaches, FWAA-Writers, Walter Camp, FN)
Reidel Anthony, Florida  (AP-1, TSN)
Rae Carruth, Colorado (AP-2, TSN)
Keith Poole, Arizona State (AP-2)
Kevin Lockett, Kansas St. (AP-3)

Tight end
David LaFleur, LSU (AP-3, Walter Camp)
Tony Gonzalez, California (AP-2, TSN, FN)
Itula Mili, BYU (AFCA-Coaches)
Pat Fitzgerald, Texas (AP-1)

Guards/tackles
Orlando Pace, Ohio St. (College Football Hall of Fame) (AP-1, AFCA-Coaches, FWAA-Writers, Walter Camp, TSN, FN)
Juan Roque, Arizona St. (AP-1, AFCA-Coaches, FWAA-Writers, Walter Camp, FN)
Benji Olson, Washington (AP-1, TSN, FN)
Scott Sanderson, Washington State (AP-3, TSN)
Chris Naeole, Colorado  (AP-1, AFCA-Coaches, Walter Camp, FN)
Dan Neil, Texas (AP-2, AFCA-Coaches, FWAA-Writers, Walter Camp, TSN)
Steve Scifres, Wyoming  (AP-2, FWAA-Writers)
Chris Dishman, Nebraska (AP-2)
Walter Jones, Florida St. (AP-2)
Ben Kaufman, Texas Tech (AP-3)
Adam Meadows, Georgia (AP-3)
Jerry Wunsch, Wisconsin (AP-3)

Center 
Aaron Taylor, Nebraska  (AP-2, FWAA-Writers, Walter Camp, FN)
Rod Payne, Michigan  (AFCA-Coaches)
K. C. Jones, Miami (Fla.) (AP-1)
Billy Conaty, Virginia Tech (TSN)
Jeff Mitchell, Florida (AP-3)

Defense

Linemen
Grant Wistrom, Nebraska (College Football Hall of Fame) (AP-1, AFCA-Coaches, FWAA-Writers, TSN, FN)
Reinard Wilson, Florida St. (AP-1, AFCA-Coaches, Walter Camp, FWAA-Writers)
Peter Boulware, Florida St. (AP-1, FWAA-Writers, TSN, FN)
Mike Vrabel, Ohio State  (AP-2, AFCA-Coaches, Walter Camp)
Derrick Rodgers, Arizona St. (AP-1, FWAA-Writers)
Jared Tomich, Nebraska (AP-2, Walter Camp)
Cornell Brown, Virginia Tech (AP-2, Walter Camp)
Michael Myers, Alabama (TSN)
Tarek Saleh, Wisconsin (FN)
William Carr, Michigan (AP-2)
Greg Ellis, North Carolina (AP-3)
Leonard Little, Tennessee (AP-3)
Darrell Russell, USC (AP-3)

Linebackers
Canute Curtis, West Virginia (AP-1, AFCA-Coaches-DL, FWAA-Writers, TSN, FN)
Pat Fitzgerald, Northwestern (College Football Hall of Fame) (AP-1, AFCA-Coaches, FWAA-Writers, Walter Camp, FN)
Jarrett Irons, Michigan  (AP-1, AFCA-Coaches, Walter Camp)
Matt Russell, Colorado (AP-1, FWAA-Writers, Walter Camp, TSN)
Jason Chorak, Washington (AP-3 {as DL], TSN, FN)
Dwayne Rudd, Alabama  (AP-2, AFCA-Coaches) 
Anthony Simmons, Clemson (AP-3, TSN)
Keith Mitchell, Texas A&M (AP-3, FN)
Andy Katzenmoyer, Ohio St. (AP-2)
Brian Simmons, North Carolina (AP-2)
Takeo Spikes, Auburn (AP-2)
Tyrus McCloud, Louisville (AP-3)
Antwaune Ponds, Syracuse (AP-3)

Backs
Chris Canty, Kansas St. (AP-1, AFCA-Coaches, FWAA-Writers, Walter Camp, TSN, FN)
Dré Bly, North Carolina (College Football Hall of Fame) (AP-1, FWAA-Writers, Walter Camp, TSN)
Charles Woodson, Michigan (College Football Hall of Fame) (AP-1, FWAA-Writers)
Shawn Springs, Ohio St. (AP-2, AFCA-Coaches, Walter Camp, FN)
Kevin Jackson, Alabama (AP-1, AFCA-Coaches, FWAA-Writers, Walter Camp, TSN, FN)
Kim Herring, Penn State (AP-2, TSN)
Kevin Abrams, Syracuse (AFCA-Coaches)
Sam Madison, Louisville  (AP-3, FN)
Bryant Westbrook, Texas (AP-2)
Kenny Wheaton, Oregon (AP-2)
Eric Allen, Indiana (AP-3)
Ronde Barber, Virginia (AP-3)
Steve Rosga, Colorado (AP-3)

Specialists

Placekicker
Marc Primanti, N.C. St. (AP-1, FWAA-Writers, TSN, FN)
Cory Wedel, Wyoming (AFCA-Coaches, Walter Camp)
Rafael Garcia, Virginia (AP-2)
Damon Shea, Nevada (AP-3)

Punter
Noel Prefontaine, San Diego St. (AP-1, FWAA-Writers)
Brad Maynard, Ball State (AP-2, AFCA, Coaches, Walter Camp)
Bill Marrinangle, Vanderbilt (TSN)
Toby Gowin, North Texas (AP-3)

All-purpose / kick returners 
Tim Dwight, Iowa (FWAA-Writers)
Kevin Faulk, LSU (AP-1)
Terry Battle, Arizona St. (AP-2, TSN)
Beau Morgan, Air Force (AP-3)

See also
 1996 All-Big Ten Conference football team
 1996 All-SEC football team

References

All-America Team
College Football All-America Teams